Morad Mohammad Bazar may refer to:
 Morad Mohammad Bazar, Chabahar
 Morad Mohammad Bazar, Polan, Chabahar County